Brett William Harvey is a Canadian film director and cinematographer based in Vancouver, British Columbia.

His directorial debut, The Union: The Business Behind Getting High, was awarded "Best Canadian Documentary" at the 2007 Edmonton International Film Festival, an award sponsored by the National Film Board.

His sequel, The Culture High, premiered in the 2014 Cinéfest Sudbury International Film Festival and won "Best Documentary" at the 2015 AMPIA Awards. In 2016 Brett directed and wrote the feature documentary "Ice Guardians". Ice Guardians was listed in Newsweek's "Favorite Documentaries Of 2016". and Sports Illustrated's "Best Of Film" in 2016.  The film went on to be nominated for four "Rosie Awards" in 2017 including "Best Documentary Over 30 minutes" and nominated for two "Leo Awards" including "Best Feature Documentary" & "Best Director".  Brett's latest documentary, "Inmate #1: The Rise of Danny Trejo", started the world film festival circuit in 2019 and won the "Audience Choice" Award for 'Best Canadian Documentary' and 'Best Overall Film', placing #1 in the 'Overall Top 10 Feature Films Rankings' list at the Calgary International Film Festival.

Filmography 

The Union: The Business Behind Getting High- 2007 - Director & Writer
The Culture High - 2014 - Director & Writer
Ice Guardians - 2016 - Director & Writer
Inmate #1: The Rise of Danny Trejo - 2019 - Director & Writer

References

External links 
 
 Official Website: https://www.brettharveyfilms.com

Film directors from Vancouver
Canadian cinematographers
Living people
Year of birth missing (living people)